The following is a list of massacres that occurred during the Bosnian War.

Incidents

References

Sources

Bosnia and Herzegovina
Massacres

 
Bosnian War